Yorkshire Coastliner operates both local and regional bus services in North Yorkshire and West Yorkshire, England. It is a subsidiary of Transdev Blazefield.

History
The company was established in 1990, when the York-based services of AJS Group were sold to Yorkshire Rider. At the time, AJS Group retained the regional services between Leeds and Bridlington, Filey, Scarborough and Whitby via York and Malton.

In August 1991, Yorkshire Coastliner was included in the purchase of AJS Group by Blazefield Group, following the sale of seven of the company's eight remaining bus firms at the time – a deal valued at £2.2 million.

In January 2006, French-based operator Transdev acquired the Blazefield Group, along with 305 vehicles.

In August 2008, Top Line Travel and Veolia Transport were purchased. The company further expanded in February 2012, following the purchase of York Pullman's local bus operations. The sale included the transfer of 31 employees and 17 vehicles.

In 2018, following the award of contracts by North Yorkshire County Council to replace those formerly operated by Stephensons of Easingwold, local services in and around York were rebranded York & Country, with vehicles subsequently rebranded in a two-tone blue livery.

Services and branding

CityZap
The CityZap brand was introduced on 27 March 2016, with services running direct between York and Leeds via the A64. As of April 2022, the service operated daily, with an hourly frequency during the day. There was no early morning or evening service.

A second service, operated by The Burnley Bus Company was launched in November 2017, running direct between Leeds and Manchester. The service was subsequently withdrawn in July 2018, owing to low passenger numbers.

In December 2020, four double-deck Alexander Dennis Enviro400MMC vehicles were introduced on services between York and Leeds – an investment of £1.4 million. Vehicles include free WiFi, USB and wireless charging, tables and audio-visual next stop announcements.

The CityZap service ceased operations on 19 November 2022, with Transdev Blazefield claiming the effects of the COVID-19 pandemic had made running the express service unsustainable.

Coastliner
The Coastliner brand encompasses a group of regional services linking the cities of Leeds and York with the towns and villages of Malton, Pickering and Thornton-le-Dale and coastal resorts of Scarborough and Whitby. Services are operated by a fleet of Volvo B5TL/Wright Gemini 3 double-deck vehicles, branded in a two-tone blue livery. Vehicles include free WiFi, USB and wireless charging and audio-visual next stop announcements.

In May 2018, the route of the 840 service, which runs between Leeds and Whitby, was voted as the "most scenic bus route in Britain" in an online poll.

Flyer
In September 2020, in partnership with Leeds Bradford Airport, Transdev Blazefield and West Yorkshire Combined Authority, the company commenced operation of a network services centring around the airport. Operations were transferred from former operator, Yorkshire Tiger, including a depot at Idle, West Yorkshire. Services 737, 747 and 757 were subsequently rebranded Flyer and renumbered A1 (Horsforth & Leeds), A2 (Bradford & Harrogate) and A3 (Bradford, Guiseley, Otley & Shipley).

As of April 2022, services are operated by a fleet of Optare Versa single-deck vehicles, branded in a yellow and purple livery. Vehicles include free WiFi, USB charging ports, audio-visual next stop announcements and additional luggage storage. Some vehicles are also fitted with wireless chargers.

York & Country 
The York & Country brand encompasses local services operating in and around the cathedral city of York, with destinations including Acomb, Derwenthorpe, Fulford, Haxby and Rawcliffe. Some services extend beyond the city to Castle Howard and Malton in the east, as well as Boroughbridge, Knaresborough and Ripon in the west. Services are operated by a fleet of Alexander Dennis Enviro200 MMC and Optare Versa single-deck vehicles, branded in a two-tone blue livery.

Fleet and operations

Depots
As of April 2022, the company operates from three depots across the region: Bradford (Idle), Malton and York (Rawcliffe).

Vehicles
As of May 2021, the fleet consists of 57 buses. The fleet consists mainly of diesel-powered single and double-deck buses manufactured by Alexander Dennis, Optare and Wrightbus.

Notes

References

External links
 
 Transdev Blazefield Limited and Transdev York Limited on Companies House
Transdev York & Country website

Bus operators in North Yorkshire
Transdev
Transport companies established in 1990
Transport in Yorkshire
1990 establishments in England
Norton-on-Derwent